Russell Selkirk (October 20, 1905 – September 25, 1993) was an American politician who served in the New York State Assembly from the Schoharie district from 1959 to 1965.

References

1905 births
1993 deaths
Republican Party members of the New York State Assembly
20th-century American politicians